Grimes Field  is a city-owned public-use airport located one nautical mile (1.85 km) north of the central business district of Urbana, a city in Champaign County, Ohio, United States. The airport is named after Warren G. Grimes, a forefather in the field of aviation lighting. It primarily serves general aviation traffic. Although it is owned by the City of Urbana, Grimes Field is self-supporting.

Facilities and aircraft 
It has two runways: 02/20 with an asphalt surface measuring 4,400 by 100 feet (1,341 x 30 m), and 01/19 with a grass surface measuring 3,000 by 100 feet (914 x 30m). The airport is home to the Airport Cafe, a small restaurant situated at the edge of the parking ramp in the main terminal building. 

For the 12-month period ending Sept 8, 2019, the airport had 23,480 aircraft operations, an average of 64 per day: 96% general aviation, 2% air taxi, and 2% military. At that time there were 42 aircraft based at this airport: 76% single-engine, 21% multi-engine, and 2% helicopter.

Museums
There are 3 museums operating at Grimes Field.

Champaign Aviation Museum
The airport is home to the Champaign Aviation Museum, which is located at its north end.

The Grimes Flying Lab Foundation

The Grimes Flying Lab Foundation is located at the airport.

Northern Branch of the Mid America Flight Museum
The northern branch of the Mid America Flight Museum is located at the airport.

Events 
Grimes Field is host to several events each year, such as FAA Wings Seminars, an EAA Young Eagles Event, a Military Appreciation Day, a Hot Air Balloon Festival, a July 4th Car Show. The airport also hosts the Mid-Eastern Regional Fly In, (MERFI).

References

External links 
 Grimes Field - Urbana Municipal Airport
 Aerial image as of 22 March 1994 from USGS The National Map (new runway later built on empty field to the north)
 

Airports in Ohio
Urbana, Ohio
Transportation in Champaign County, Ohio
National Aviation Heritage Area
Buildings and structures in Champaign County, Ohio